Lester Eugene Asheim (January 22, 1914 – July 1, 1997) was an American librarian and scholar of library science.  
He was on the faculty of the University of Chicago and the University of North Carolina and held positions in the American Library Association (ALA).
He was included among the "100 most important leaders we had in the 20th century" by the American Library Association.

Early life

Lester Asheim was born on January 22, 1914, in Spokane, Washington. His family moved to Seattle, which is where he grew up until he went to the University of Washington. While there he earned two undergraduate degrees, one in English in 1936, and another in Librarianship in 1937. He also earned his Masters in American literature in 1941 from the same institution.

When the United States entered World War II, Asheim joined the Army Signal Corps for three years. After his tour of duty, Asheim attended the University of Chicago. He earned his Ph.D in Librarianship from the University's graduate program in 1949.

Academic life

Asheims' first faculty position was at the University of Chicago, which started in 1948 while he was still attaining his Ph.D. He became dean in 1952 and held the position until he left the school in 1961. From 1961 until 1971 he held two different positions with the American Library Association (ALA). His first was Director of International relations until 1966, then he moved on to be the Director of the ALA's office for library education. Asheim left the ALA in 1971 to return to the University of Chicago as a faculty member. In 1975 he accepted a position as a faculty member at the University of North Carolina. He remained at the School of Information and Library Science until his retirement in 1984. His papers are archived at the Southern Historical Collection of the Wilson Library on the University of North Carolina at the Chapel Hill campus

Death and afterward

Asheim died on July 1, 1997, in Chapel Hill, North Carolina. The Library and Science department at the University Of North Carolina has created a scholarship fund in his name.

Contribution to library science
Asheim made some of the most important contributions in Library science through his work on censorship in the library atmosphere. Asheim was an active librarian in a time of great growth in the library science community. His most famous article entitled "Not Censorship, But Selection" has become as ingrained to library science as the five laws of Ranganathan.

Asheim's article articulated the difference between censorship and selection in several parts that address each of the problems that were associated with collection continuation.  He presents and advocates several rules that librarians should follow in deciding what materials to include and exclude in their libraries' collections.

Asheim's article is still cited by library science community decades later when dealing with the problems of cyber materials. The article "Lester Asheim in Cyberspace: A tribute to Sound reasoning" by June Pinnell-Stephens takes Asheim's arguments and applies them to the cyber age.

Published works
 
 Asheim, L. E. (1983). Selection and censorship: a reappraisal. Wilson Library Bulletin, 58, 180–184.

Awards
Professor Asheim received many awards during his lifetime. These included:
University of Washington Distinguished Alunmni Award in 1966.
Illinois Library Association Intellectual Freedom Award in 1966.
Beta Phi Mu Award for Distinguished Service to Education for Librarianship in 1973.
The Joseph W. Lippincott Award in 1976.
ALA Honorary Membership in 1984.
ALISE Award for Professional contribution to Library and Information Science Education in 1992.

In 1979, in honor of Asheim's 65th birthday, the festschrift, a collection of articles written in his honor, As Much to Learn as to Teach  was published.

References

External links
 

1914 births
1997 deaths
University of Chicago faculty
University of Washington alumni
University of North Carolina at Chapel Hill faculty
American librarians
American librarianship and human rights
University of Chicago Graduate Library School alumni